The dissolution of the monasteries in Portugal was a nationalization of the property of male monastic orders effected by a decree of 28 May 1834 enacted by Joaquim António de Aguiar at the conclusion of the Portuguese Civil War. Portugal thus terminated the state sanction of male religious orders, and nationalized the lands and possessions of over 500 monasteries. The new government hoped to distribute land and goods in the hands among the poorer landowners, but there were few who could buy.

See also
History of Portugal (1834–1910)
History of Roman Catholicism in Portugal
Joaquim António de Aguiar
Religion in Portugal
Suppression of monasteries, elsewhere in Europe.

References

1834 in Portugal
Anti-Catholicism in Portugal
Religion in Portugal
History of Catholicism in Portugal
May 1834 events